Dyckesville is an unincorporated census-designated place in Brown and Kewaunee counties in the U.S. state of Wisconsin located in the towns of Green Bay and Red River. As of the 2010 census its population was 538. Dyckesville is bypassed by Wisconsin Highway 57, which ran through the community until 2006. Dyckesville is part of the Green Bay Metropolitan Statistical Area.

History
Dyckesville was founded around 1860 by Louis Van Dycke, and named for him.

Climate

References

Census-designated places in Wisconsin
Census-designated places in Brown County, Wisconsin
Census-designated places in Kewaunee County, Wisconsin
Green Bay metropolitan area